Keystone is an unincorporated community in Chester Township, Wells County, in the U.S. state of Indiana.

History
A large share of the early settlers being natives of Pennsylvania caused the name of Keystone to be selected, after the Keystone State.

The post office at Keystone has been in operation since 1871. Kathryn Powers is its current postmaster.

Geography

References

Unincorporated communities in Wells County, Indiana
Unincorporated communities in Indiana
Fort Wayne, IN Metropolitan Statistical Area